Acheville is a commune in the Pas-de-Calais department in northern France.

Geography
Acheville is situated some 4 miles (7 km) southeast of Lens, on the D33.

Population

See also
Communes of the Pas-de-Calais department

References

External links

 Website of the Communaupole de Lens-Liévin 

Communes of Pas-de-Calais
Artois